Catalpa bungei, commonly known as Manchurian catalpa, is a species of catalpa native to China. The specific epithet honors the botanist Alexander Bunge, who collected the specimens that Carl Anton von Meyer later described. The flowers are arranged in a corymb and are densely spotted with pink. It is cultivated in China, along with C. ovata, for its wood, which is also used for coffins, ancestral tablets, and oars. It also used as an ornamental tree.

References

External links
 USDA Plants Profile: Catalpa bungei
 
 

bungei
Ornamental trees
Trees of China
Endemic flora of China